Wilmington is a port city in and the county seat of New Hanover County in coastal southeastern North Carolina. With a population of 115,451 at the 2020 census, it is the eighth-most populous city in the state.  Wilmington is the principal city of the Cape Fear-Wilmington metropolitan statistical area, which includes New Hanover and Pender Counties in southeastern North Carolina, which had a population of 301,284 at the 2020 census.

Wilmington's historic downtown has a  Riverwalk, developed as a tourist attraction in the late 20th century. In 2014, Wilmington's riverfront was ranked as the "Best American Riverfront" by readers of USA Today.  The National Trust for Historic Preservation selected Wilmington as one of its 2008 Dozen Distinctive Destinations.

City residents live between the Cape Fear River and the Atlantic Ocean, with four nearby beach communities just outside Wilmington: Fort Fisher, Wrightsville Beach, Carolina Beach, and Kure Beach, all within half-hour drives from downtown Wilmington. The city is home to University of North Carolina Wilmington (UNCW), which provides a wide variety of programs for undergraduates, graduate students, and adult learners, in addition to cultural and sports events open to the community.

Toward the end of the 19th century, Wilmington was a majority-black, racially integrated, prosperous city, and the largest city in North Carolina. In the Wilmington massacre of 1898, white supremacists launched a coup that overthrew the legitimately elected local Fusionist government. They expelled opposition black and white leaders from the city, destroyed the property and businesses of black citizens built up since the Civil War, including the only black newspaper in the city, and killed an estimated 60 to more than 300 people. This coincided with broader efforts of disenfranchisement at the state level. Whereas North Carolina had 125,000 registered black voters in 1896, it had 6,000 black voters by 1902. By 1910, Charlotte overtook Wilmington as North Carolina's largest city.

On September 2, 2020, then-President Trump officially declared Wilmington as the first World War II Heritage City in the country. The World War II battleship , now a war memorial, is moored across from the downtown port area, and is open to the public for tours. Other attractions include the Cape Fear Museum of History and Science, The Children's Museum of Wilmington, and the Wilmington Hammerheads United Soccer Leagues soccer team.

Wilmington is also the home of EUE/Screen Gems Studios, the largest domestic television and movie production facility outside California. Dream Stage 10, the facility's newest sound stage, is the third-largest in the United States. It houses the largest special-effects water tank in North America. After the studio's opening in 1984, Wilmington became a major center of American film and television production. Numerous movies and television shows, in a range of genres, have been produced here, including Iron Man 3, Super Mario Bros., The Conjuring, A Walk to Remember, The Crow, Sleepy Hollow, Dawson's Creek, One Tree Hill, and The Summer I Turned Pretty.

History

Colonial beginnings

The city was founded in the 1730s, and after going through a series of different names (New Carthage, New London, Newton), its name became Wilmington in 1740, named after Spencer Compton, 1st Earl of Wilmington.

The area along the river had been inhabited by various successive cultures of indigenous peoples for thousands of years. At the time of European encounter, historic Native Americans were members of tribes belonging to the Eastern Siouan family.

The ethnic European and African history of Wilmington spans more than two and a half centuries. In the early 16th century, Italian explorer Giovanni da Verrazzano, commissioned by the king of France with a French crew, was reportedly the first European to see this area, including the city's present site. The first permanent colonial settlement in the area was established in the 1720s by European settlers. In September 1732, a community was founded on land owned by John Watson on the Cape Fear River, at the confluence of its northwest and northeast branches. The settlement, founded by the first royal governor, George Burrington, was called New Carthage, and then New Liverpool; it gradually took on the name New Town or Newton. Governor Gabriel Johnston soon after established his government there for the North Carolina colony. In 1739 or 1740, the town was incorporated with a new name, Wilmington, in honor of Spencer Compton, Earl of Wilmington.

Some early settlers of Wilmington came from the Albemarle and Pamlico regions, as well as from the colonies of Virginia and South Carolina, but most new settlers migrated from the northern colonies, the West Indies, and Northern Europe. Many of the early settlers were indentured servants from Northern Europe. As the indentured servants gained their freedom and fewer could be persuaded to travel to North America because of improving conditions back home, the settlers imported an increasing number of slaves to satisfy the labor demand. By 1767, African slaves accounted for more than 62% of the population of the Lower Cape Fear region. Many worked in the port as laborers, and some in ship-related trades.

Naval stores and lumber fueled the region's economy, both before and after the American Revolution. During the Revolutionary War, the British maintained a garrison at Fort Johnston near Wilmington.

Revolutionary era

Due to Wilmington's commercial importance as a major port, it had a critical role in opposition to the British in the years leading up to the revolution. The city had outspoken political leaders who influenced and led the resistance movement in North Carolina. The foremost of these was Wilmington resident Cornelius Harnett, who was serving in the General Assembly at the time, and where he rallied opposition to the Sugar Act in 1764. When the British Parliament passed the Stamp Act the following year, designed to raise revenue for the Crown with a kind of tax on shipping, Wilmington was the site of an elaborate demonstration against it.

On October 19, 1765, several hundred townspeople gathered in protest of the new law, burned an effigy of one town resident who favored the act, and toasted to "Liberty, Property, and No Stamp Duty." On October 31, another crowd gathered in a symbolic funeral of "Liberty". Before the effigy was buried, though, Liberty was found to have a pulse, and celebration ensued.

William Houston of Duplin County was appointed stamp receiver for Cape Fear. When Houston visited Wilmington on business, still unaware of his appointment, he recounted,

"The Inhabitants immediately assembled about me & demanded a Categorical Answer whether I intended to put the Act relating [to] the Stamps in force. The Town Bell was rung[,] Drums [were] beating, Colours [were] flying and [a] great concourse of People [were] gathered together." For the sake of his own life, and "to quiet the Minds of the inraged  and furious Mobb...," Houston resigned his position at the courthouse.Donna J. Spindel. "Law and Disorder: The North Carolina Stamp Act Crisis"North Carolina Historical Review, 56: 1981. p. 8.

Governor William Tryon made attempts to mitigate the opposition, to no avail. On November 18, 1765, he pleaded his case directly to prominent residents of the area. They said the law restricted their rights. When the stamps arrived on November 28 on the HMS Diligence, Tryon ordered them to be kept on board. Shipping on the Cape Fear River was stopped, as were the functions of the courts.

Tryon, after having received his official commission as governor (a position he had assumed only after the death of Arthur Dobbs), was brought to Wilmington by Captain Constantine Phipps on a barge from the Diligence, and "was received cordially by the gentlemen of the borough." He was greeted with the firing of seventeen pieces of artillery, and the New Hanover County Regiment of the North Carolina militia, who had lined the streets. This "warm welcome" was spoiled, however, after a dispute arose between Captain Phipps and captains of ships in the harbor regarding the display of their colors. The townspeople became infuriated with Phipps and threats were made against both sides. After Tryon harangued them for their actions, the townspeople gathered around the barrels of punch and ox he had brought as refreshments. The barrels were broken open, letting the punch spill into the streets; they threw the head of the ox into the pillory, and gave its body to the enslaved population. Because of the unrest, Tryon moved his seat of government to New Bern instead of Wilmington.

On February 18, 1766, two merchant ships arrived without stamped papers at Brunswick Town. Each ship provided signed statements from the collectors at their respective ports of origin that no were stamps available, but Captain Jacob Lobb of the British cruiser Viper seized the vessels. In response, numerous residents from southern counties met in Wilmington. The group organized as the Sons of Liberty and pledged to block implementation of the Stamp Act. The following day, as many as a thousand men, including the mayor and aldermen of Wilmington, were led by Cornelius Harnett to Brunswick to confront Tryon. The governor was unyielding, but a mob retrieved the seized ships. They forced royal customs officers and public officials in the region to swear never to issue stamped paper. The Westminster Parliament repealed the Stamp Act in March 1766

Antebellum period

In the 1830s, citizens of Wilmington became eager to take advantage of railroad transportation. At this time, the shipping tonnage registered at Wilmington was 9,035.  Plans were developed to build a railroad line from the capital, Raleigh, to Wilmington. When Raleigh citizens declined to subscribe in sufficient number to stock to raise money for the project, organizers changed the terminus to Weldon. When the railroad line was completed in 1840, it was the longest single line of railroad track in the world. The railroad also controlled a fleet of steamboats that ran between Wilmington and Charleston; these were used both for passenger travel and freight. Regular boat lines served Fayetteville, and packet lines traveled to northern ports. The city was a main stopover point, contributing greatly to its commerce.

By mid-century, the churchyard of St. James Episcopal Church and other town cemeteries had become filled with graves. On November 16, 1853, a group of citizens, organized as "the Proprietors of the Wilmington Cemetery", was formed to develop a new cemetery. Sixty-five acres of land around Burnt Mill Creek were chosen as the site for what would be called Oakdale Cemetery. It was the first rural cemetery in North Carolina. The cemetery's first interment, on February 6, 1855, was six-year-old Annie deRosset. Many remains from St. James churchyard were relocated to the new cemetery.

The Wilmington Gas Light Company was established in 1854. Soon after, streetlights were powered by gas made from lightwood and rosin, replacing the old street oil lamps. On December 27, 1855, the first cornerstone was laid, and construction began on a new city hall. A grant from the Thalian Association funded the attached opera house, named Thalian Hall. In 1857, the city opened its first public school, named the Union Free School, on 6th Street between Nun and Church Streets, serving White students.

Wilmington had a Black majority population before the Civil War. While most were slaves, the city had a significant community of free people of color, who developed businesses and trades. For a period up to Nat Turner's rebellion, they had been allowed to vote, carry arms, and serve in the militia. Fears after the rebellion resulted in the state legislature passing laws to restrict the rights of free Blacks.

Civil War

During the Civil War, the port was the major base for Confederate and privately owned blockade runners, which delivered badly needed supplies from England. The Union mounted a blockade to reduce the goods received by the South. The city was captured by Union forces in the Battle of Wilmington in February 1865, about one month after the fall of Fort Fisher had closed the port. As nearly all the military action took place some distance from the city, numerous antebellum houses and other buildings survived the war years.

Reconstruction era and 1898 insurrection

During the Reconstruction era, former free Blacks and newly emancipated freedmen built a community in the city. About 55% of its residents were Black people. At the time, Wilmington was the largest city and the economic capital of the state.

Three of the city's aldermen were Black. Black people were also in positions of justice of the peace, deputy clerk of court, street superintendent, coroners, policemen, mail clerks, and mail carriers.

At the time, Black people accounted for over 30% of Wilmington's skilled craftsmen, such as mechanics, carpenters, jewelers, watchmakers, painters, plasterers, plumbers, stevedores, blacksmiths, masons, and wheelwrights. In addition, they owned 10 of the city's 11 restaurants and were 90% of the city's 22 barbers. The city had more Black bootmakers/shoemakers than White ones, and half of the city's tailors were Black. Lastly, two brothers, Alexander and Frank Manly, owned the Wilmington Daily Record, one of the few Black-owned newspapers in the state, which was reported to be the only one in the country.

In the 1890s, a coalition of Republicans and Populists had gained state and federal offices. The Democrats were determined to reassert their control. Violence increased around elections in this period, as armed White paramilitary insurgents, known as Red Shirts, worked to suppress Black and Republican voting. White Democrats regained control of the state legislature and sought to impose white supremacy, but some Blacks continued to be elected to local offices.

The Wilmington Insurrection of 1898 (formerly and inaccurately called a race riot) occurred as a result of the racially charged political conflict that had occurred in the decades after the Civil War and efforts by White Democrats to re-establish white supremacy and overturn Black voting. In 1898, a cadre of White Democrats, professionals, and businessmen planned to overthrow the city government if their candidates were not elected. Two days after the election, in which a White Republican was elected mayor and both White and Black aldermen were elected, more than 1500 White men (led by Democrat Alfred M. Waddell, an unsuccessful gubernatorial candidate in 1896) attacked and burned the only Black-owned daily newspaper in the state and ran off the new officers. They overthrew the legitimately elected municipal government. Waddell and his men forced the elected Republican city officials to resign at gunpoint and replaced them with men selected by leading White Democrats. Waddell was elected mayor by the newly seated board of aldermen that day. Prominent African Americans and White Republicans were banished from the city in the following days. This is the only such coup d'état in United States history.

Whites attacked and killed an estimated 10–100 Blacks; no Whites died in the violence. As a result of the attacks, more than 2100 Blacks permanently left the city, leaving a hole among its professional and middle classes. The demographic change was so large that the city became majority White, rather than the majority Black it was before the coup.

Following these events, the North Carolina legislature passed a new constitution that raised barriers to voter registration, imposing requirements for poll taxes and literacy tests that effectively disfranchised most Black voters, following the example of Mississippi. Blacks were essentially excluded from the political system until after the enactment of the federal Voting Rights Act of 1965.

20th century
Wilmington is home to the Bijou Theater, which began as a tent in 1904 and progressed to a permanent structure in 1906.  It operated until 1956, making it the oldest movie theater in the state and one of the oldest, continuously running theaters in the country.  In 1910, Charlotte passed Wilmington to become North Carolina's largest city. In the mid-20th century, efforts to preserve many historic building began. Due to this, many historic buildings were listed as National Register of Historic Places. Around the '80s, the city was used for filming of many horror films, such as Blue Velvet in 1984 and I Know What You Did Last Summer in 1997. In 1990, the final extension of Interstate 40 in North Carolina was opened and officially connected Wilmington to the interstate highway system via Raleigh.

World War II
During World War II, Wilmington was the home of the North Carolina Shipbuilding Company. The shipyard was created as part of the U.S. government's Emergency Shipbuilding Program. Workers built 243 ships in Wilmington during the five years the company operated.

Three prisoner-of-war (POW) camps operated in the city from February 1944 through April 1946. At their peak, the camps held 550 German prisoners. The first camp was located on the corner of Shipyard Boulevard and Carolina Beach Road; it was moved downtown to Ann Street, between 8th and 10th Avenues, when it outgrew the original location. A smaller contingent of prisoners was assigned to a third site, working in the officers' mess and doing groundskeeping at Bluethenthal Army Air Base, which is now Wilmington International Airport.

21st century 
During the '90s, Wilmington began to grow rapidly, partially due to the film industry and the completion of I-40. The city successfully annexed the areas of Seagate in 1998 and Masonboro in 2000. The annexation of Monkey Junction was stopped in 2012 by the North Carolina House of Representatives after local backlash. In 2017, the North Carolina Department of Environmental Quality found that the Cape Fear River had been polluted by a chemical called GenX, discharged by a Chemours plant near Fayetteville, NC. In 2020, President Donald Trump designated Wilmington to be the first WWII Heritage city in the country due to the city's contribution during the war.

National Register of Historic Places
The Audubon Trolley Station, Brookwood Historic District, Carolina Heights Historic District, Carolina Place Historic District, City Hall/Thalian Hall, Delgrado School, Federal Building and Courthouse, Fort Fisher, Gabriel's Landing, William Hooper School (Former), Market Street Mansion District, Masonboro Sound Historic District, Moores Creek National Battlefield, Sunset Park Historic District, USS North Carolina (BB-55) National Historic Landmark, James Walker Nursing School Quarters, Westbrook-Ardmore Historic District, Wilmington Historic District, and Wilmington National Cemetery are listed on the National Register of Historic Places.

Geography

It is the eastern terminus of Interstate 40, an east-west freeway that ends 2,554 miles away at Barstow, California, where it joins I-15, the gateway to Southern California. This road passes through many major cities and state capitals along the way.

Wrightsville Beach is a common destination in the Wilmington area. Carolina Beach and Kure Beach also add to the city's attractions.

Climate
Wilmington has a humid subtropical climate (Köppen Cfa), with these characteristics:

Winters are generally mild with January highs in the mid-50s °F (~12 °C) and lows in the mid-30s °F (~1 °C). Snowfall does not occur in most years, and when it does, is generally light.
Spring is reasonably lengthy, beginning in late February and lasting to early May. The presence of abundant dense vegetation in the area causes significant pollen dusting in the springtime that tends to turn rooftops and cars yellow.
Summer brings high humidity, with daily high temperatures usually ranging from the upper 80s to lower 90s °F (31–34 °C), and daily low temperatures usually from 70 to 75 °F (~22 °C). Heat indices can easily break the  mark, though the actual temperature does not in most years. Due to the proximity of warm Atlantic Ocean waters and prevailing tropical-system tracks, the Wilmington area is subject to hurricane or tropical storm activity, mostly from August to early October, with an average frequency of once every seven years. Such tropical systems can bring high winds and very heavy rains, sometimes  or more in a single tropical system. Precipitation in Wilmington occurs year-round. In an average year, the July to September period delivers nearly 40% of annual rainfall.
Autumn is also generally humid at the beginning, with the threat from tropical weather systems (hurricanes, tropical storms, and tropical depressions) peaking in September.
 Normal January mean temperature: . The coldest month in recorded history was January 1977, averaging .
 Normal July mean temperature: . The hottest month in recorded history was July 2012, averaging .
 Average nights ≤ : 39
 First and last freezes of the season: November 18 and March 20, allowing a growing season of 244 days
 Average days ≥ : 43, but historically as low as 9 in 1909 and as high as 71 in 1980.
 First and last 90 °F highs: May 15, September 15
 Highest recorded temperature:  on June 27, 1952
 Lowest daily maximum temperature:  on February 13, 1899 and December 30, 1917
 Highest daily minimum temperature:  on August 1, 1999 and August 9, 2007
 Lowest recorded temperature:  on December 25, 1989
The 2018 annual precipitation of 102.40 inches exceeded the previous record wettest year (1877, with 83.65 inches of precipitation).
 Wettest day:  on September 15, 1999
 Driest month:  in April 1995
 Winter average snowfall:  (the median amount is 0)
 Snowiest 24-hour period:  on February 17–18, 1896
 Snowiest month:  in December 1989, making the winter of 1989–90 the snowiest

Cityscape

Wilmington boasts a large historic district encompassing nearly 300 blocks.
Abandoned warehouses on downtown's northern end have been recently demolished making room for multimillion dollar projects, such as what was the World Headquarters of Pharmaceutical Product Development (now Thermo Fisher Scientific) and tallest building in Wilmington at 228 feet, a state-of-the-art convention center, Live Oak Bank Pavilion, Pier 33 Apartments, and The Strands houseboat community in Port City Marina.

Downtown/Old Wilmington

Crime

Between 2006 and 2008, crime rates, as reported through the Federal Bureau of Investigation's Uniform Crime Reports, decreased in 6 of the 8 reported categories.

Wilmington has an increasing problem with gang violence and on October 15, 2013, the WPD and NHC sheriff's department created a joint task force to combat gang violence. Just a day later the city council approved $142,000 in funding for a gang investigative unit.

Demographics

2020 census

As of the 2020 United States census, there were 115,451 people, 54,673 households, and 27,131 families residing in the city.

2013
According to 2013 census estimates, there were 112,067 people and 47,003 households in the city. The population density was 2,067.8 people per square mile (714.2/km)and there were 53,400 housing units. The racial composition of the city was: 73.5% White, 19.9% Black or African American, 6.1% Hispanic or Latino American, 1.2% Asian American, 0.5% Native American, 0.1% Native Hawaiian or other Pacific Islander.

There were 34,359 households, out of which 20.4% had children under the age of 18 living with them, 33.5% were married couples living together, 14.0% had a female householder with no husband present, and 49.5% were non-families. 36.6% of all households were made up of individuals, and 11.3% had someone living alone who was 65 years of age or older. The average household size was 2.10 and the average family size was 2.77.

In the city, the population was spread out, with 18.4% under the age of 18, 17.2% from 18 to 24, 28.5% from 25 to 44, 20.6% from 45 to 64, and 15.3% who were 65 years of age or older. The median age was 34 years. For every 100 females, there were 87.5 males. For every 100 females age 18 and over, there were 85.0 males.

The median income for a household in the city was $31,099, and the median income for a family was $41,891. Males had a median income of $30,803 versus $23,423 for females. The per capita income for the city was $21,503. About 13.3% of families and 19.6% of the population were below the poverty line, including 25.9% of those under age 18 and 12.0% of those age 65 or over.

Religion

Less than half of Wilmington's population is religiously affiliated (47.30%), with the majority of practitioners being Christian. The two largest Christian denominations in Wilmington are Protestant: Baptists (14.66%) and Methodists (8.29%), followed by Roman Catholics (7.42%). There are also a significant number of Presbyterians (3.19%), Episcopalians (2.30%), Pentecostals (1.45%), and Lutherans (1.32%). Other Christian denominations make up 7.02%, and the Latter-Day Saints have 0.90%.  Much smaller is the proportion of residents who follow Islam (0.46%), and Judaism (0.25%). A small percentage of people practice Eastern religions (0.04%).

Wilmington has significant historical religious buildings, such as the Basilica Shrine of St. Mary and the Temple of Israel.

Transportation

Airport

The Wilmington International Airport (ILM) serves the area with commercial air service provided by American Airlines, Delta Air Lines, United Airlines and Avelo Airlines. American Airlines carries a large share of the airport's traffic, and therefore flies the largest of the aircraft in and out of the airport.  The airport serves over 930,000 travelers per year. The airport is also home to two fixed-base operations (FBOs) that currently house over 100 private aircraft. The airport maintains a separate International Terminal providing a full service Federal Inspection Station to clear international flights. This includes U.S. Customs and Border Protection, U.S. Department of Agriculture and the U.S. Department of Immigration. The airport is 4 miles from downtown and is served by Wave Transit buses.

Interstate highways

U.S. Routes

 (To be the Military Cutoff Extension and the Hampstead Bypass, ending in Pender County)

North Carolina state highways

Alternative transportation options
Public transit in the area is provided by the Cape Fear Public Transportation Authority, which operates fixed bus routes, shuttles, and a free downtown trolley under the brand name Wave Transit. A daily intercity bus service to Raleigh is provided by Greyhound Lines. Wilmington is also served by Amtrak Thruway bus connections to Wilson, North Carolina where connections can be made with Amtrak's Carolinian and Palmetto. The city's Union Station last had passenger train service in 1968 with the Seaboard Coast Line's predecessor version of the Palmetto. The Seaboard Air Line's station last had service in 1958, with a daily train to Charlotte via Hamlet.

The NCDOT Cape Fear Run bicycle route connects Apex to Wilmington and closely parallels the RUSA 600 km brevet route.

Taxicab services are available from several vendors, however, the City's Taxi Commission keeps meter rates artificially low. In 2021, regulations were eased to help the taxi industry compete with other companies like Uber and Lyft.

The Gary Shell Cross-City Trail is primarily a multi-use trail that provides bicycle and pedestrian access to numerous recreational, cultural and educational destinations in Wilmington. The Gary Shell Cross-City Trail provides bicycle and pedestrian connection from Wade Park, Halyburton Park and Empie Park to the Heide-Trask Drawbridge at the Intracoastal Waterway. It also connects to the River to Sea Bikeway and the under-construction Central College Trail and Greenville Loop Trail.

Economy

Wilmington's industrial base includes electrical, medical, electronic and telecommunications equipment; clothing and apparel; food processing; paper products; nuclear fuel; and pharmaceuticals. Wilmington is part of North Carolina's Research coast, adjacent to the Research Triangle Park in Durham, NC.

Also important to Wilmington's economy is tourism due to its close proximity to the ocean and vibrant nightlife.

Located on the Cape Fear River, which flows into the Atlantic Ocean, Wilmington is a sizable seaport, including private marine terminals and the North Carolina State Ports Authority's Port of Wilmington.

Wilmington is home to the Greater Wilmington Chamber of Commerce, the oldest Chamber in North Carolina, organized in 1853. Companies with their headquarters in Wilmington include Live Oak Bank and HomeInsurance.com.

Top employers

According to the City's 2014 Comprehensive Annual Financial Report, the top employers in the city are:

Government
Wilmington adopted a council–manager form of government in 1941.

Mayor
List of mayors of Wilmington, North Carolina
 John Sampson, 1760
 Frederick Gregg, circa 1760s
 Moses John deRosset, circa 1766
 ?
 Hinton James c.1800s, first student to attend the University of North Carolina

 William James Harriss, ?-1839, physician, died in office
 Colonel John McRae c.1855
 A.H. Van Bokkelen, 1866
 John Dawson ? - 1868
 Joseph H. Neff, 1868-?
 Silas N. Martin, 1871-1872
 S.H. (Solomon Harry) Fishblate 1878-1880, 1893
 Edward Dudley Hall 1883-1887
 A. G. Ricaud, 1891-1893
 Silas P. Wright 1897-1898 resigned at gunpoint and Waddell installed in his place.
 Alfred Moore Waddell, 1898–1906
 William B. Cooper, 1902-1903 as mayor pro tempore
 William E. Springer 1907-1910
 Joseph D. Smith, circa 1911
 P.Q. (Parker Quince) Moore, c. 1913-1921
 James Cowen, circa 1922
 William E. Mayo 1921-1924 died in office
 Katherine Mayo Cowan 1924-1925 assumed her husband's term
 Walter H. Blair, 1926-1937
 Robert E. Cooper 1937-1940
 Hargrove Bellamy 1941-1942
Edgar Yow, 1942-1943
 Bruce B. Cameron 1943-1944, died in office
 W. Ronald Lane, 1945-1946
 J.E.L. "Hi, Buddy" Wade, 1948 (as mayor pro tem), 1949–1950, 1958–1960
 Royce McClelland 1951
 E.S. Capps 1952–1953, 1960–1961
 E. L. White, circa 1953–1955
 Daniel David Cameron, 1956–1958
 Ogden Allsbrook, 1961–1970
 Hannah Block, circa 1963 (as mayor pro tempore)
 Luther M. Cromartie, 1970–1971
 Benjamin David Schwartz, circa 1971–1972
 John Symes, 1972
 Herbert B. Brand, 1973–1975
 Ben Halterman, 1975–1983
 William Schwartz, circa 1983-1985
 Berry Armon Williams, 1985–1987
 Don Betz, 1987–1997
 Hamilton Hicks, 1997–1999
 David L. Jones, 1999–2001
 Harper Peterson 2001–2003
 Spence Broadhurst, 2003–2006
 Bill Saffo, 2007–present

Education

Universities and colleges

 University of North Carolina at Wilmington
 Cape Fear Community College
 Shaw University satellite campus
 University of Mount Olive satellite campus
 University of North Carolina at Pembroke satellite campus
 Miller-Motte Technical College

Schools
Public schools in Wilmington are operated by the New Hanover County School System.

High schools
 Eugene Ashley High School
 John T. Hoggard High School
 Isaac Bear Early College High School
 Emsley A. Laney High School
 New Hanover High School
 Mosley Performance Learning Center
 Wilmington Early College High School
 Girls’ Leadership Academy (GLOW)

Middle schools
 Holly Shelter Middle School
 Murray Middle School.
 Myrtle Grove Middle School	
 MCS Noble Middle School
 Roland-Grise Middle School
 Trask Middle School
 Williston Middle School
 Lake Forest Academy School
 St. Mark Catholic School (Wilmington, North Carolina)

Elementary schools
 Masonboro Elementary School
 Alderman
 Anderson
 Bellamy
 Blair
 Bradley Creek
 Castle Hayne
 Codington
 College Park
 Eaton
 Forest Hills
 Freeman School of Engineering
 Gregory School of Science, Mathematics, and Technology
 Holly Tree
 Lake Forest Academy
 Mary C. Williams
 Murrayville
 New Horizons Elementary School (private)
 Ogden
 Pine Valley Elementary School
 Snipes Academy of Arts and Design
 Sunset Park
 Winter Park
 Wrightsboro
 Wrightsville Beach
 Friends School of Wilmington
 St. Mark Catholic School (Wilmington, North Carolina)

Academies and alternate schools

 Cape Fear Academy
 The Lyceum Academy
 St. Mark Catholic School (Wilmington, North Carolina)
 St. Mary Catholic Church (Wilmington, North Carolina)
 Wilmington Academy of Arts and Sciences
 Cape Fear Center for Inquiry

Healthcare
New Hanover Regional Medical Center is a hospital in Wilmington. It was established in 1967 as a public hospital, and it was the first hospital in the city to admit patients of all races. It was operated by New Hanover County. In February 2021 Novant Health, a nonprofit private organization, acquired the hospital.

Culture

Performing arts
The city supports a very active calendar with its showcase theater, Thalian Hall, hosting about 250 events annually. The complex has been in continuous operation since it opened in 1858 and houses three performance venues, the Main Stage, the Grand Ballroom, and the Studio Theater.

The Hannah Block Historic USO/Community Arts Center, 120 S. Second Street in historic downtown Wilmington, is a multiuse facility owned by the City of Wilmington and managed by the Thalian Association, the Official Community Theater of North Carolina.  Here, five studios are available to nonprofit organizations for theatrical performances, rehearsals, musicals, recitals and art classes. For more than half a century, the Hannah Block Historic USO Building has facilitated the coming together of generations, providing children with programs that challenge them creatively, and enhance the quality of life for residents throughout the region.

The Hannah Block Second Street Stage is home to the Thalian Association Children's Theater.  It is one of the main attractions at the Hannah Block Community Arts Center. The theater seats 200 and is used as a performance venue by community theater groups and other entertainment productions.

The University of North Carolina at Wilmington College of Arts and Science departments of Theatre, Music and Art share a state-of-the-art, $34 million Cultural Arts Building, which opened in December 2006. The production area consists of a music recital hall, art gallery, and two theaters. Sponsored events include 4 theater productions a year.

The Brooklyn Arts Center at St. Andrews is a 125-year-old building on the corner of North 4th and Campbell St in downtown Wilmington. The Brooklyn Arts Center at Saint Andrews (BAC) is on the National Register of Historic Places. The BAC is used for weddings, concerts, fundraisers, art shows, vintage flea markets, and other community-driven events.

Wilmington is home to the Wilmington Conservatory of Fine Arts, a studio for foundlings. The Wilmington Conservatory of Fine Arts is the only studio in the region to offer Progressing Ballet Technique™ instruction from two certified instructors. The Conservatory is also host to Turning Pointe Dance Company, a faith-based dance company, which performs artistic pieces such as "Pinocchio" for the Wilmington Community.

Film

Wilmington is home to EUE/Screen Gems Studios.  Its prominent place in the cinema throughout the '80s and the '90s earned the city the moniker "Hollywood East". Popular television series like Dawson's Creek, One Tree Hill, Sleepy Hollow, SIX, Good Behavior, Eastbound and Down and Under The Dome were filmed at the studio and on location throughout the city. Movies shot in Wilmington include Maximum Overdrive (1986), Crimes of the Heart (1986), Year of the Dragon (1985), Blue Velvet (1986), King Kong Lives (1986), Hiding Out (1987), Raw Deal (1986), Track 29 (1988), Weeds (1987), Teenage Mutant Ninja Turtles (1990), The Crow (1994), Silver Bullet (1985), Firestarter (1984), Iron Man 3, A Walk to Remember,
We're the Millers, The Longest Ride and The Choice. Actor Brandon Lee was killed in an accidental shooting during the filming of The Crow.

Since 1995, Wilmington hosts an annual, nationally recognized, independent film festival called "Cucalorus." It is the keystone event of The Cucalorus Film Foundation, a non-profit organization. The Foundation also sponsors weekly screenings, several short documentary projects, and the annual Kids Festival, with hands on film-making workshops.

The Cape Fear Independent Film Network also hosts a film festival annually, and the Wilmington Jewish Film Festival also takes place yearly. For several years Wilmington was also the location of fan conventions for One Tree Hill, reuniting the cast and drawing tourists to the city.

In 2014, Governor Pat McCrory decided not to renew the film incentives, which ended up taking a massive toll on not just Wilmington's but North Carolina's entire film industry. As a result, most productions and film businesses moved to Atlanta, Georgia. As of 2017, there have been attempts to bring the industry back to North Carolina via the North Carolina Film and Entertainment Grant. This grant designates $31 million per fiscal year (Jul 1 – Jun 30) in film incentives.

Literature
Birthplace of Johnson Jones Hooper (1815–1862), Author of the Simon Suggs Series.

Birthplace of Robert Ruark (1915–1965)

Now rare, an early edition of the Scottish poet Robert Burns's "Poems, Chiefly in the Scottish Dialect" was printed by Bonsal and Niles of Market Street, Baltimore in 1804.

Music
Chamber Music Wilmington was founded in 1995 and presents its four-concert "Simply Classical" series every season. The concerts are performed by world-class chamber musicians and are held at UNCW's Beckwith Recital Hall.

The Wilmington Symphony Orchestra was established in 1971 and offers throughout the year a series of five classical performances, and a Free Family Concert.
Wilmington is also home to numerous music festivals.

One of the largest DIY festivals, the Wilmington Exchange Festival, occurs over a period of 5 days around Memorial Day each year. It is currently in its 13th year.

Celebrating its 37th year, February 2 thru 4, 2017, the North Carolina Jazz Festival is a three-day traditional jazz festival that features world-renowned jazz musicians.

The Cape Fear Blues Society is a driving force behind blues music in Wilmington. The organization manages, staffs and sponsors weekly Cape Fear Blues Jams and the annual Cape Fear Blues Challenge talent competition (winners travel to Memphis TN for the International Blues Challenge). Its largest endeavor is the Cape Fear Blues Festival, an annual celebration that showcases local, regional and national touring blues artists performing at a variety of events and venues, including the Cape Fear Blues Cruise, Blues Workshops, an All-Day Blues Jam, and numerous live club shows. Membership in the CFBS is open to listeners and musicians alike.

Museums and historic areas

 Cameron Art Museum
 The Bellamy Mansion
 Cape Fear Museum of History and Science
 The Children's Museum of Wilmington
 First Baptist Church (founded 1808)
 Fort Fisher Historic Area
 Grace United Methodist Church (founded 1797)

 St. James Episcopal Church – the oldest church in Wilmington
 St. Mary Catholic Church – historic Roman Catholic church in Wilmington
 First Presbyterian Church – historic Presbyterian church
 Latimer House Museum
 Sunset Park Historic District
 Temple of Israel – the oldest synagogue in North Carolina
 USS North Carolina Memorial
 Wilmington Railroad Museum
 Hannah Block Historic USO

The Second and Orange Street USO Club was erected by the Army Corps of Engineers at a cost of $80,000. Along with an identical structure on Nixon Street for African-American servicemen, it opened in December 1941, the same month that the Japanese attacked Pearl Harbor. From 1941 to 1945, the USO hosted 35,000 uniformed visitors a week. Recently renovated with sensitivity to its historic character, the Hannah Block Historic USO (HBHUSO) lobby serves as a museum where World War II memorabilia and other artifacts are displayed. The building itself was rededicated in Ms. Block's name in 2006 and restored to its 1943 wartime character in 2008. The building is listed in the National Register of Historic Places. The World War II Wilmington Home Front Heritage Coalition, an all volunteer 501(c)(3) preservation organization, is the de facto preservationist of the building's history and maintains the home front museum.

Festivals
Wilmington is host to many annual festivals, including, most notably, the Azalea Festival.  The Azalea Festival, sponsored by the Cape Fear Garden Club, features a garden tour, historic home tour, garden party, musical performances, a parade, and a fireworks show.  It takes places every year in April.

Media

Newspapers
The Star-News is Wilmington's daily newspaper; read widely throughout the Lower Cape Fear region and now owned by Gannett, following its merger with the Star's previous owner, GateHouse Media.  A daily online newspaper, Port City Daily (portcitydaily.com), is owned by Local Voice Media.  Two historically black newspapers are distributed and published weekly: The Wilmington Journal and The Challenger Newspapers.  Encore Magazine is a weekly arts and entertainment publication.

Broadcast radio

AM
630 AM WMFD – Sports ("ESPN Radio, AM 630")
1340 AM WLSG – Regional Mexican ("La Raza 94.1")

FM
89.7 FM WDVV – Worship & Praise Music ("The Dove, 89.7")
90.5 FM WWIL-FM – Christian Music ("Life 90.5")
91.3 FM WHQR – Public Radio
93.1 FM WBPL-LP – Wilmington Catholic Radio
94.1 FM W231CL Regional Mexican ("La Raza 94.1") (WLSG translator)
95.5 FM W238AV – Contemporary Christian ("K-LOVE")
95.9 FM W240AS – Soft AC  ("95.9 The Breeze") (WKXB translator)
97.3 FM WMNX – Hip Hop/R & B ("Coast 97.3")
100.5 FM W263BA – Contemporary Christian ("K-LOVE")
101.3 FM WWQQ-FM- Country ("Double Q, 101")
102.7 FM WGNI – Hot AC ("102.7 GNI")
104.5 FM WYHW – Christian Talk ("104.5")

Television
The Wilmington television market is ranked 130 in the United States, and is the smallest DMA in North Carolina. The broadcast stations are as follows:
WWAY, Channel 3, (ABC affiliate, with CBS on 3.2 and CW on 3.3): licensed to Wilmington, owned by Morris Multimedia
WECT, Channel 6, (NBC affiliate): licensed to Wilmington, owned by Gray Television
WILM-LD, Channel 10, (Independent station): licensed to Wilmington, owned by the Capitol Broadcasting Company
WSFX-TV, Channel 26, (Fox affiliate): licensed to Wilmington, owned by American Spirit Media and operated by Gray Television
WUNJ-TV, Channel 39, (PBS member station, part of the UNC-TV Network)

Cable news station News 14 Carolina also maintains its coastal bureau in Wilmington.

On September 8, 2008, at noon, WWAY, WECT, WSFX, WILM-LP and W51CW all turned off their analog signals, making Wilmington the first market in the nation to go digital-only as part of a test by the Federal Communications Commission (FCC) to iron out transition and reception concerns before the nationwide shutoff. Wilmington was chosen as the test market because the area's digital channel positions will remain unchanged after the transition. As the area's official conduit of emergency information, WUNJ did not participate in the early analog switchoff, and kept their analog signal on until the national digital switchover date of June 12, 2009. W47CK did not participate due to its low-power status; FCC rules currently exempt low-powered stations from the 2009 analog shutdown. WILM-LP and W51CW chose to participate, even though they are exempt as LPTV stations.

Despite Tropical Storm Hanna making landfall southwest of Wilmington two days before (September 6), the switchover continued as scheduled. The ceremony was marked by governmental and television representatives flipping a large switch (marked with the slogan "First in Flight, First in Digital") from analog to digital.

Sports

The Wilmington Sharks are a Coastal Plain League (CPL) baseball team in Wilmington that was founded in 1997 and was among the charter organizations when the CPL was formed that same year. The roster is made up of top collegiate baseball players fine-tuning their skills using wood bats to prepare for professional baseball. Their stadium is located at Buck Hardee Field at Legion Stadium.

The Wilmington Sea Dawgs are a Tobacco Road Basketball League (TRBL) team that began its inaugural season with the American Basketball Association (ABA) in November 2006 and have also played in the Premier Basketball League, and the Continental Basketball League.

The Wilmington Hammerheads are a professional soccer team based in Wilmington. They were founded in 1996 and played in the United Soccer Leagues Second Division. Their stadium was the Legion Stadium. After the 2009 season, the USL discontinued their relationship with the franchise owner Chuck Sullivan. The Hammerheads franchise returned in 2011.

The University of North Carolina Wilmington sponsors 19 intercollegiate sports and has held Division 1 membership in the NCAA since 1977. UNCW competes in the Colonial Athletic Association and has been a member since 1984.

The University of North Carolina Wilmington is also home to the Seamen Ultimate Frisbee team.  The team won the National Championship in 1993 and most recently qualified for the USA Ultimate College Nationals tournament in 2014

The Cape Fear Rugby Football Club is an amateur rugby club playing in USA Rugby South Division II. They were founded in 1974 and hosts the annual Cape Fear Sevens Tournament held over July 4 weekend; hosting teams from all over the world. They own their own rugby pitch located at 21st and Chestnut St.

Off and on, from 1900 to 2001, Wilmington has been home to a professional minor league baseball team. The Wilmington Pirates, a Cincinnati Reds farm team, were one of the top clubs in the Tobacco State League from 1946–50. Most recently the Wilmington Waves, a Class A affiliate of the Los Angeles Dodgers, played in the South Atlantic League. Former All Star catcher Jason Varitek played for Wilmington's Port City Roosters in 1995 and 1996. In 1914 the Philadelphia Phillies held spring training in Wilmington.

The beach near Wilmington, NC is home to the annual O’Neil/Sweetwater Pro-Am and Music Festival, the second largest surfing contest on the East Coast.

Shopping complexes
Independence Mall
Cotton Exchange of Wilmington
Mayfaire Town Center
Hanover Center Shopping Mall
Long Leaf Mall
Chandler's Wharf
Front Street Center
The Point at Barclay

Points of interest
 Airlie Gardens
 New Hanover County Extension Service Arboretum
 North Carolina Aquarium at Fort Fisher
 North Carolina Azalea Festival
 EUE Screen Gems Studios
  Battleship & Museum
 University of North Carolina at Wilmington Arboretum
 Cameron Art Museum
 Cape Fear Museum of History and Science
 Carolina Beach
 Kure Beach
 Wrightsville Beach
 Fort Fisher State Recreation Area

Notable people

Art and literature
 Jock Brandis, author, co-founder of the Full Belly Project
 Wiley Cash, author
 Mark Cox, poet
 Minnie Evans, folk artist
 Barbara Guest, poet and prose stylist
 Will Inman, poet
 Sharyn McCrumb, author
 Peggy Payne, writer, journalist, and consultant to writers
 Celia Rivenbark, humor columnist and author
 Robert Ruark, author, syndicated columnist, and big game hunter
 Emily McGary Selinger (1848–1927), painter, writer, poet, educator
 Betsy Thornton, author

Government and politics
 Joseph Carter Abbott, colonel in Union Army during American Civil War, Republican state senator representing North Carolina from 1868–1871
 John Dillard Bellamy, congressman
 Timothy Bloodworth, teacher and statesmen, elected to the First United States Congress
 Deb Butler, serves in the North Carolina House of Representatives
 John Cox, member of the Virginia House of Delegates
 George Davis, politician and lawyer
 Lucien C. Gause, lawyer and politician representing Arkansas
 Eustace Edward Green was a state legislator and educator in the North Carolina and a doctor in Georgia
 Susi Hamilton, Democratic member of the North Carolina House of Representatives
 Lethia Sherman Hankins, African American woman city council member
 Cornelius Harnett, merchant, farmer, and statesman, delegate for North Carolina in the Continental Congress
 William Hooper (1742–1790), member Continental Congress; Signer United States Declaration of Independence; Deputy Attorney General, NC; federal judge
 John Peter LaFrenz, politician representing New York
 Charles A. McClenahan, member of the Maryland House of Delegates for district 38
 Daniel F. McComas, born in San Juan, Puerto Rico, served as member of the North Carolina General Assembly representing New Hanover County
 Harry Payne, state representative and North Carolina Commissioner of Labor
 Duncan K. McRae, attorney, diplomat, and state legislator
 Samuel D. Purviance, represented North Carolina in the United States House of Representatives 
 Bill Saffo, longest serving mayor in Wilmington's history
 John Sampson, politician before and after the American Colonial era
 Carson Smith, Republican member of the North Carolina House of Representatives, previously served as sheriff to Pender County, North Carolina
 Charles Manly Stedman, politician and lawyer
 William Francis Strudwick, early U.S. congressman between serving 1796 and 1797
 James Thorington, lawyer, judge, and one term U.S. representative from Iowa's 2nd congressional district
 Lara Trump, daughter-in-law of former US President Donald Trump
 Alfred Moore Waddell, lawyer, politician, and publisher
 Garland H. White, preacher and politician who served as chaplain for the 28th United States Colored Infantry Regiment
 Woodrow Wilson, 28th president of the United States

Media and entertainment
 Barnacle Boi, electronic music producer, vocalist, and visual artist
 David Brinkley, television newscaster for NBC and ABC
 Cliff Cash, stand-up comedian
 Charlie Daniels, country music legend, inducted into the Grand Ole Opry and the Country Music Hall of Fame.
 Sammy Davis Sr., dancer and father of entertainer Sammy Davis Jr.
Maddie Hasson, actress, best known for her role as Willa Monday on the short lived Fox television series The Finder
 Johnson J. Hooper, 19th century humorist
 Caterina Jarboro, first black opera singer ever to sing on an opera stage in America. In 1999, she was inducted into the Wilmington Walk of Fame.
 Charles Kuralt, award-winning journalist
 Jane McNeill, stage, film, and television actress
 Don Payne, writer and producer
 Willis Richardson, playwright 
 James Wall, stage manager and actor

Military
 Edwin Anderson Jr., Medal of Honor recipient
 Eugene Ashley Jr., Medal of Honor recipient
 Arthur Bluethenthal, football player and World War I pilot
 William D. Halyburton Jr., Medal of Honor recipient
 Joseph McNeil, member of the Greensboro Four during Civil rights movement, and former major general in the U.S. Air Force
 Charles P. Murray Jr., Medal of Honor recipient
 Ilario Pantano, United States Marine
 William Gordon Rutherfurd, commanded  during the Battle of Trafalgar
 Ted Sampley, Vietnam veteran and POW-MIA activist
 John Steele, paratrooper; subject of the film The Longest Day
 John Ancrum Winslow, officer in the United States Navy during the Mexican–American War and American Civil War

Sportspeople
Kadeem Allen (born 1993), basketball player in the NBA and currently for Hapoel Haifa in the Israeli Basketball Premier League
 Marvin Allen, UNC Chapel Hill soccer coach
 Wright Anderson, Elon University football coach
 Reggie Barnes, former pro-skateboarder and owner of Eastern Skateboard Supply
 Connor Barth, NFL kicker
 Nick Becton, NFL offensive tackle
 Sam Bowens, MLB player
 Derek Brunson, mixed-martial-arts fighter
 Jonathan Cooper, NFL offensive guard
 Alge Crumpler, NFL tight end
 Hoss Ellington, NASCAR driver
 Roman Gabriel, former NFL Most Valuable Player
 Kenny Gattison, former NBA player
 Althea Gibson, tennis player
 Tyrell Godwin, MLB player
 Keever Jankovich, NFL player
 Sam Jones, Basketball Hall of Famer and former NBA player
 Kitwana Jones, CFL defensive end
 Michael Jordan, Basketball Hall of Famer, businessman, and former NBA player
 Sonny Jurgensen, Pro Football Hall of Famer and former NFL player
 Clarence Kea, basketball player
 Meadowlark Lemon, Basketball Hall of Famer and former Harlem Globetrotter
 Sugar Ray Leonard, Olympic gold-medal boxer
 Quinton McCracken, Major League Baseball outfielder
 Teana Miller, WNBA player
 Rodney Moore, boxer
 Ron Musselman, MLB pitcher
 Trot Nixon, MLB outfielder
 Jim Norton, NFL defensive lineman
 Pat Ogrin, NFL defensive tackle
 Sam Pellom, NBA player
 Jackie Rogers, NASCAR driver
 Jay Ross, NFL nose guard
 Robert Ruark, sportsman and syndicated writer
 Sonny Siaki, professional wrestler
 Charles Sinek, competitive ice dancer
 Harvest Smith, professional basketball player
 Willie Stargell, MLB outfielder and first baseman
 Ross Tomaselli, professional soccer player
 Ty Walker, professional basketball player
 Tamera "Ty" Young, WNBA player

Other notables
 Julia Dalton, Miss North Carolina USA 2015
 Kristen Dalton, Miss North Carolina USA 2009 & Miss USA 2009
 Sarah Graham Kenan, philanthropist
 Samuel Mendelsohn, Lithuanian Jewish rabbi and scholar
 Charles J. Mendelsohn, cryptographer and classicist
 Louis T. Moore, preservationist, author, historian, photographer, and civic promoter
 Eliza Hall Nutt Parsley, founder of the NC Division of the United Daughters of the Confederacy
 Thomas Peters, early founder of Sierra Leone
 Fred Pickler, actor, author, and photographer
 Robert Robinson Taylor, American architect
 David Walker (1796–1830), Black abolitionist
 Amy Wright, CNN Hero of the Year 2017
 Fr. Thomas Price, first native Catholic priest of North Carolina

Sister cities
Wilmington is a sister city with the following cities:

 Dandong, Liaoning, China—1986
/ Doncaster, South Yorkshire, United Kingdom—1989
 Bridgetown, Barbados—2004
 San Pedro Town, Belize—2007

See also
List of municipalities in North Carolina
Gregory Normal School

Notes

References

Further reading

 Wilmington Directory. 1860, 1865, 1867, 1871, 1879, 1889, 1900, 1911

External links

 
 

 
Cities in North Carolina
County seats in North Carolina
Populated places established in 1739
Port cities and towns of the United States Atlantic coast
Cape Fear (region)
1739 establishments in North Carolina
Cities in New Hanover County, North Carolina
Capitals of North Carolina
Populated coastal places in North Carolina
Populated places on the Cape Fear River
World War II Heritage Cities